MacPherson Peak is a prominent rock peak rising to  on the northwest end of Pomerantz Tableland, in the Usarp Mountains of Antarctica. It was mapped by the United States Geological Survey (USGS) from surveys and U.S. Navy air photos, 1960–62, and was named by the Advisory Committee on Antarctic Names for Frank L. MacPherson, U.S. Army, a helicopter mechanic in the field supporting the USGS surveys Topo North–South (1961–62) and Topo East–West (1962–63), the latter including a survey of this peak.

References

External links

Mountains of Oates Land